Mayssa Raquel de Oliveira Pessoa, also known as Mayssa Pessoa or simply Mayssa (born 11 September 1984) is a Brazilian female handball goalkeeper for Dunărea Brăila and the Brazilian national team.

She was one of nearly two dozen LGBT Olympians at the London Games.

Achievements
 Romanian National League:
 Winner: 2015, 2016
 Romanian Cup:
 Finalist: 2015
 EHF Champions League:
 Winner: 2016
 Finalist: 2017
 Russian Super League:
 Winner: 2013, 2014
 French Championship:
 Silver Medalist: 2012
 World Championship:
 Winner: 2013
 Pan American Championship:
 Winner: 2013
 World Games:
 Winner: 2005

Awards and recognition
 All-Star Goalkeeper of the Pan American Championship: 2013
 MVP of the Bucharest Trophy: 2014
 Team of the Tournament Goalkeeper of the Bucharest Trophy: 2014, 2015

Personal life
Pessoa comes from a family of intellectuals. Nicknamed Taffarel, she resides in the same city with Hulk (João Pessoa). Her father is a university professor and a former athlete who competed in handball, volleyball, basketball, futsal and beach handball. Her mother is a lawyer, and one of her two sisters is a pediatrician.

References

Brazilian female handball players
1984 births
Bisexual sportspeople
Bisexual women
LGBT handball players
Brazilian LGBT sportspeople
Living people
People from João Pessoa, Paraíba
Handball players at the 2012 Summer Olympics
Handball players at the 2016 Summer Olympics
Olympic handball players of Brazil
Expatriate handball players
Brazilian expatriate sportspeople in France
Brazilian expatriate sportspeople in Russia
Brazilian expatriate sportspeople in Romania
Brazilian expatriate sportspeople in North Macedonia
Pan American Games gold medalists for Brazil
Pan American Games medalists in handball
Handball players at the 2015 Pan American Games
World Games gold medalists
Competitors at the 2005 World Games
Medalists at the 2015 Pan American Games
Sportspeople from Paraíba